Wanted – $5,000 is a 1919 American short comedy film featuring Harold Lloyd. This film is presumed lost.

Cast
 Harold Lloyd 
 Bebe Daniels
 Sammy Brooks
 William Gillespie
 Lew Harvey
 Bud Jamison
 Margaret Joslin
 Dee Lampton
 Marie Mosquini
 James Parrott
 Snub Pollard
 Noah Young

See also
 Harold Lloyd filmography

References

External links

1919 films
1919 comedy films
1919 short films
Silent American comedy films
American silent short films
American black-and-white films
Films directed by Gilbert Pratt
American comedy short films
1910s American films